A dew pond is an artificial pond usually sited on the top of a hill, intended for watering livestock. Dew ponds are used in areas where a natural supply of surface water may not be readily available. The name dew pond (sometimes cloud pond or mist pond) is first found in the Journal of the Royal Agricultural Society in 1865. Despite the name, their primary source of water is believed to be rainfall rather than dew or mist.

Construction

They are usually shallow, saucer-shaped and lined with puddled clay, chalk or marl on an insulating straw layer over a bottom layer of chalk or lime. To deter earthworms from their natural tendency of burrowing upwards, which in a short while would make the clay lining porous, a layer of soot would be incorporated or lime mixed with the clay. The clay is usually covered with straw to prevent cracking by the sun and a final layer of chalk rubble or broken stone to protect the lining from the hoofs of sheep or cattle. To retain more of the rainfall, the clay layer could be extended across the catchment area of the pond. If the pond's temperature is kept low, evaporation (a major water loss) may be significantly reduced, thus maintaining the collected rainwater. According to researcher Edward Martin, this may be attained by building the pond in a hollow, where cool air is likely to gather, or by keeping the surrounding grass long to enhance heat radiation. As the water level in the basin falls, a well of cool, moist air tends to form over the surface, restricting evaporation.

A method of constructing the base layer using chalk puddle was described in The Field 14 December  1907. 
A Sussex farmer born in 1850 tells how he and his forefathers made dew ponds:

The initial supply of water after construction has to be provided by the builders, using artificial means. A preferred method was to arrange to finish the excavation in winter, so that any fallen snow could be collected and heaped into the centre of the pond to await melting.

History

The mystery of dew ponds has drawn the interest of many historians and scientists, but until recent times there has been little agreement on their early origins. It was widely believed that the technique for building dew ponds has been understood from the earliest times, as Kipling tells us in Puck of Pook's Hill: "…the Flint Men made the Dewpond under Chanctonbury Ring."  The two Chanctonbury Hill dew ponds were dated, from flint tools excavated nearby and similarity to other dated earthworks, to the neolithic period. Landscape archaeology too seemed to demonstrate that they were used  by the inhabitants of the nearby hill fort (probably from an earlier date than that of the surviving late Bronze Age structure) for watering cattle. A more prosaic assessment from Maud Cunnington, an archaeologist from Wiltshire, while not ruling out a prehistoric origin, describes such positive interpretations of the available evidence as no more than “flights of fancy”. 

A strong claim to antiquity may, however, be made for at least one Wiltshire  dew pond: A land deed dated 825 CE mentions Oxenmere at Milk Hill, Wiltshire, showing that dew ponds were in use during the Saxon period. The parliamentary enclosures of the mid eighteenth to mid nineteenth centuries caused many new upland ponds to be made, as access to traditional sources of drinking water for livestock was cut off. The suggestion has also been made that the nursery rhyme about Jack and Jill may refer to collecting water from a dew pond at the top of a hill, rather than from a well.

The naturalist Gilbert White, writing in 1788, noted that during extended periods of summer drought the artificial ponds on the downs above his native Selborne, Hampshire, retained their water, despite supplying flocks of sheep, while larger ponds in the valley below had dried up. In 1877 H. P. Slade observed that this was because the lower ponds have debris washed into them from surface water drainage, making them shallow, but the higher ones do not: the smaller volume of water is depleted more rapidly. Later observations demonstrated that during a night of favourable dew formation a typical increase in water level of some two or three inches was possible. However, there remains controversy about the means of replenishment of dew ponds.  Experiments conducted in 1885 to determine the origin of the water found that dew forms not from dampness in the air but from moisture in the ground directly beneath the site of the condensation: dew, therefore, was ruled out as a source of replenishment. Other scientists have pointed out that the 1885 experiments failed to take into account the insulating effect of the straw and the cooling effect of the damp clay: the combined effect would be to keep the pond at a lower temperature than the surrounding earth and thus able to condense a disproportionate share of moisture.
In turn these conclusions were disproved in the 1930s, when it was pointed out that the heat-retaining quality of water (its thermal capacity) was many times greater than that of earth, and therefore the air above a pond in summer would be the last place to attract condensation. The deciding factor, it was concluded, is the extent of the saucer-shaped basin extending beyond the pond itself: the large basin would collect more rainfall than a pond created without such a surrounding feature.

Dew ponds are still common on the downlands of southern England, the North Derbyshire and Staffordshire moorlands and in Nottinghamshire.

Measuring dew production
The first scientific experiments to measure and correlate the rate of dew deposit with evaporation were made by Harry Pool Slade of Aston Upthorpe, Berkshire, between June 1876 and February 1877, at a dew pond on Aston Upthorpe Downs. Slade measured overnight dew deposit (by weighing cotton wool when dry and after overnight exposure), evaporation from copper pans beside the pond, the depletion of the pond, and relative humidity. He found that on days with heavy overnight dewfall the level of water in the pond was not replenished but invariably diminished.

In situ measurements of evaporation and condensation were taken at the Helmfleeth dew pond in Poppenbüll municipality (Eiderstedt Peninsula in Schleswig-Holstein, Germany) using meteorological measuring instruments and a floating evaporation pan after Brockamp & Werner (1970). These measurements proved the dew formation on the basis of temperature changes and the weather conditions. The Helmfleeth dew pond is part of the water supply for a marsh area and is still in use today.

Reproductions of historical dew ponds
In 2014, the traditional technique was verified by means of modern building material at reproductions of dew ponds in East Friesland. In this context, various techniques were tried in two terrestrial hollows. Commercially available PVC-film was used for the sealing and foam glass gravel for the insulation. The construction was carried out by craftsmen and the climatological analysis by Werner and Coldewey.

See also
 Air well (condenser)
 Rainwater harvesting

References

Bibliography

 
 
 
  (Note: link is 1907 ed.)

Journal articles

Dewponds in specific locations

Further reading

External links

Articles
Building instructions from Popular Science
Wiltshire Community History information about Wiltshire dew ponds
Article about dew ponds in Ascension Island

Images
Dew pond images at Geograph

Appropriate technology
Ecological techniques
Irrigation
Ponds
Water supply
Water conservation